Rhopalopyx is a genus of true bugs belonging to the family Cicadellidae.

The species of this genus are found in Europe.

Species:
 Rhopalopyx adumbrata (C.Sahlberg, 1842)
 Rhopalopyx brachyanus Orosz, 1999

References

Cicadellidae
Hemiptera genera